Grand Hótel Reykjavík is the tallest hotel in Iceland. It became the tallest when construction of an additional tower was completed in 2007, surpassing the nearby Hilton Reykjavík Nordica Hótel.

References 

Buildings and structures in Reykjavík
Hotel buildings completed in 2007
Hotels in Iceland